Anomala is a genus of shining leaf chafers in the family of beetles known as Scarabaeidae. There are at least 1,200 described species in Anomala.

A common characteristic behavior of beetles in Anomala is that most grubs of these species feed on the roots of grasses, becoming a pest in many areas where they invade. One notable species is the Oriental beetle (Anomala orientalis), which was introduced to North America and has since become a major pest in several mid-Atlantic states.

Selected species
Anomala albopilosa
Anomala anoguttata
Anomala cupripes
Anomala binotata
Anomala cavifrons
Anomala delicata
Anomala hualienensis
Anomala flavipennis
Anomala horticola
Anomala innuba
Anomala linwenhsini
Anomala lucicola
Anomala ludoviciana
Anomala marginata
Anomala oblivia
Anomala orientalis
Anomala undulata
Anomala vitis
Anomala wutaiensis

See also
 List of Anomala species

References

External links

 Bugguide.net genus profile

Rutelinae
Taxa named by George Samouelle